Chelsea Square is a garden square in Chelsea, London.

It lies in the area between King's Road and Fulham Road, between Old Church Street and Dovehouse Street, with Manresa Road off the south side, and South Parade running along its north side.

It was originally called Trafalgar Square.

In December 2021, it was named the fourth most expensive street in the UK, with an average house price of £18.8 million.

References

Chelsea, London
Streets in the Royal Borough of Kensington and Chelsea
Garden squares in London
Squares in the Royal Borough of Kensington and Chelsea